Bhavnagar Terminus is a railway station serving Bhavnagar town, in Bhavnagar district of the Indian state of Gujarat. It is under Bhavnagar railway division of Western Railway zone of Indian Railways. Bhavnagar Terminus is "A" category station of Bhavnagar railway division of Western Railway zone.

Total 18 trains start from here.

Major trains

Following major trains start from Bhavnagar Terminus railway station:
 20966/65 Bhavnagar Terminus-Sabarmati Intercity Superfast Express
 17203/04 Bhavnagar Terminus–Kakinada Port Express
 19259/60 Kochuveli–Bhavnagar Express
 12941/42 Parasnath Express
 12971/72 Bandra Terminus–Bhavnagar Terminus Superfast Express
 22963/64 Bandra Terminus–Bhavnagar Terminus Weekly Superfast Express
 19107/08 Bhavnagar Terminus–Udhampur Janmabhoomi Express

See also
Bhavnagar State Railway

References

Railway stations in Bhavnagar district
Bhavnagar railway division
Railway terminus in India